The 1918 United States House of Representatives elections in South Carolina were held on November 5, 1918 to select seven Representatives for two-year terms from the state of South Carolina.  The primary elections were held on August 27 and the runoff elections were held two weeks later on September 10.  All seven incumbents were re-elected and the composition of the state delegation remained solely Democratic.

1st congressional district 
Incumbent Democratic Congressman Richard S. Whaley of the 1st congressional district, in office since 1913, was unopposed in his bid for re-election.

General election results

|-
| 
| colspan=5 |Democratic hold
|-

2nd congressional district 
Incumbent Democratic Congressman James F. Byrnes of the 2nd congressional district, in office since 1911, won the Democratic primary and was unopposed in the general election.

Democratic primary

General election results

|-
| 
| colspan=5 |Democratic hold
|-

3rd congressional district 
Incumbent Democratic Congressman Frederick H. Dominick of the 3rd congressional district, in office since 1917, defeated Wyatt Aiken in the Democratic primary and was unopposed in the general election.

Democratic primary

General election results

|-
| 
| colspan=5 |Democratic hold
|-

4th congressional district 
Incumbent Democratic Congressman Samuel J. Nicholls of the 4th congressional district, in office since 1915, won the Democratic primary and was unopposed in the general election.

Democratic primary

General election results

|-
| 
| colspan=5 |Democratic hold
|-

5th congressional district 
Incumbent Democratic Congressman William F. Stevenson of the 5th congressional district, in office since 1917, was unopposed in his bid for re-election.

General election results

|-
| 
| colspan=5 |Democratic hold
|-

6th congressional district 
Incumbent Democratic Congressman J. Willard Ragsdale of the 6th congressional district, in office since 1913, was unopposed in his bid for re-election.

General election results

|-
| 
| colspan=5 |Democratic hold
|-

7th congressional district 
Incumbent Democratic Congressman Asbury Francis Lever of the 7th congressional district, in office since 1901, won the Democratic primary and defeated Republican R.H. Richardson in the general election.

Democratic primary

General election results

|-
| 
| colspan=5 |Democratic hold
|-

See also
United States House of Representatives elections, 1918
South Carolina gubernatorial election, 1918
South Carolina's congressional district s

References

"Report of the Secretary of State to the General Assembly of South Carolina.  Part II." Reports of State Officers Boards and Committees to the General Assembly of the State of South Carolina. Volume II. Columbia, SC: 1919, pp. 31–33.

South Carolina
1918
1918 South Carolina elections